Marta Dassù (born 8 March 1955) is an Italian politician who served as Deputy Minister of Foreign Affairs in the government of Mario Monti from 2011 to 2014. She serves as Senior Director of European Affairs at the Aspen Institute and Editor-in-Chief of Aspen Institute Italia's journal, Aspenia. She is a regular contributor to the Italian newspaper La Stampa.

In 2020, Dassù was appointed by NATO Secretary General Jens Stoltenberg to join a group of experts to support his work in a reflection process to further strengthen NATO's political dimension.

Other activities

Corporate boards
 Finmeccanica, Member of the Board of Directors
 Trevi Finanziaria, Non-executive and Independent Member of the Board of Directors

Non-profit organizations
 European Council on Foreign Relations (ECFR), Member of the Board (since 2019)
 The Center for American Studies in Rome, Vice President
 European Institute of Peace (EIP), Member of the Advisory Council
 European Policy Centre (EPC), Member of the Strategic Council
 Fondazione Eni Enrico Mattei, Member of the Board
 International Institute for Strategic Studies (IISS), Member of the Board
 Istituto Affari Internazionali (IAI), Member Board of Directors
 LUISS School of Government, Member of the Scientific Committee
 Trilateral Commission, Member of the European Group

References

External links

Living people
1955 births
Italian politicians